This is a list of tunnels documented by the Historic American Engineering Record in the U.S. state of Colorado.

Tunnels

See also
List of bridges documented by the Historic American Engineering Record in Colorado

References

Tunnels
Tunnels
Colorado